Years in the Darkness is the first album by metal band Arkaea. It was released on July 14, 2009. A music video for the track "Locust" was made. The album charted at No. 39 on the Billboard Heatseekers Chart with approximately 980 copies sold in its first week.

Track listing
All lyrics written by Jon Howard.

All music written by Christian Olde Wolbers and Raymond Herrera except "Awakening" written by Christian Olde Wolbers, Raymond Herrera and Pat Kavanagh and "Away from the Sun" written by Jon Howard.

 "Locust- 4:26
 "Beneath the Shades of Grey" - 5:04
 "Years in the Darkness" - 4:15
 "Gone Tomorrow" - 4:09
 "Awakening" - 3:45
 "Black Ocean" - 4:10
 "Break the Silence" - 5:07
 "Lucid Dream" - 3:44
 "My Redemption" - 4:13
 "War Within" - 4:15
 "The World as One" - 4:16
 "Rise Today" - 4:37
 "Away From the Sun" - 5:41
 "Blackened Sky" (European Bonus Track) - 4:23

Credits
 Jon Howard - vocals, acoustic guitar and piano on "Away from the Sun"
 Christian Olde Wolbers - guitars, keyboards
 Pat Kavanagh - bass
 Raymond Herrera - drums

Personnel
 Produced by Christian Olde Wolbers
 Co-produced by Threat Signal and Arkaea
 Mixing by Terry Date
 Mastering by Ted Jensen at Sterling Sound.
 Artwork by Gustavo Sazes

References

2009 albums
Arkaea albums